Southern Expressway may refer to:

Southern Expressway (Adelaide), South Australia
E01 expressway (Sri Lanka)
A portion of U.S. Route 219 in New York
A portion of Interstate 376 near Pittsburgh
Southern Expressway (England), a road in Runcorn, Cheshire and part of the A533 road.